The Royal Malaysian Police College Kuala Lumpur (Malay: Maktab Polis Diraja Malaysia Kuala Lumpur) is a police educational institution located in Hulu Langat District, Selangor, Malaysia. It is responsible for training senior officers in the Royal Malaysia Police and the Malaysian Armed Forces. The college also trains police officers and soldiers from Singapore, Brunei, Thailand, Russia, the United Kingdom and the United States.

History
The idea for a Senior Officers College was first proposed by the then Inspector General of Police, the Honorable Tun Mohd Hanif B Omar, after a conducting a study on the need to improve the conditions of training institutions. The college's grounds were broken on 7 January 1994 at the Police Field Force Central Brigade, Cheras, opposite the previous Police College. The physical construction of the college began on 16 January 1996, and the institution began operating in part on 31 January 1999.

The Senior Officers' College executes the function of four previous training institutions namely:
 Police College, Kuala Kubu Bahru, Selangor
 Criminal Investigation College, KL
 Special Branch Training School, KL
 Traffic Training School, Cheras, KL

The college was officially opened on 10 July 2004 by the former Prime Minister and Internal Security Minister of Malaysia, Tun Abdullah Bin Haji Ahmad Badawi

College organisations
The college is headed by a commandant with the rank of Deputy Commissioner of Police (DCP) who is responsible for three centres of training, two centres of training support and two administrative divisions as below:
 Centre for Management Science
 Centre for Investigation & Prosecution
 Centre for Intelligence Science & Strategic Studies
 Centre for Research and Curriculum Development
 Centre for Morale Building
 Management Division
 Camp Commandant Division

Since opening, several new units have been added to institution, including the Centre for Disaster & Crisis Management which is headed by an Assistant Commissioner of Police (ACP); and the Diploma in Investigative Studies Unit, to be headed by an Assistant Commissioner of Police (ACP). The college is also tasked with training newly recruited officers, so the Basic Policing Training Program Unit was formed. This unit is headed by an officer with the rank of Deputy Superintendent of Police (DSP).

Past Commandants
SAC Yahaya Udin (1999)
SAC Acryl Sani Abdullah Sani (2004)

DCP Dato' Yong Lei Choo (?–2019)
DCP Dato' Tan Chong Jin (1 November 2019 – 22 July 2022)
DCP Ahmad Dzaffir bin Yussof (15 August 2022 – 19 September 2022)
DCP Dato' Pahlawan Anuar bin Othman (24 September 2022–present)

See also
 PULAPOL

References

External links
 Maktab Polis Diraja Malaysia Kuala Lumpur

1999 establishments in Malaysia
Educational institutions established in 1999
Hulu Langat District
Police academies in Malaysia
Royal Malaysia Police